Tsuchida (written: 土田 literally "soil rice field") is a Japanese surname. Notable people with the surname include:

, Japanese ice hockey player
, Japanese painter
, Japanese photographer
, Japanese voice actor and actor
, Japanese footballer
, Japanese Go player
Masao Tsuchida, Japanese badminton player
, Japanese actress
Shin Tsuchida (土田慎, born 1990), Japanese politician
Steven Tsuchida, American film and television director
, Japanese video game designer
, Japanese comedian, television personality and presenter
, Japanese wheelchair racer

See also
Tsuchida Production, a defunct animation production company

Japanese-language surnames